The Canterbury Puzzles and Other Curious Problems is a 1907 mathematical puzzle book by Henry Dudeney. The first part of the book features a series of puzzles based on the characters from The Canterbury Tales by Geoffrey Chaucer.

References

External links
 
 1908 edition, E. P. Dutton, New York
 2002 Dover reprint 

1907 books
Gamebooks
Works based on The Canterbury Tales